Ich Troje ("The Three of Them") is a Polish pop band. Ich Troje was founded in 1996 by songwriter Michał Wiśniewski and composer Jacek Łągwa. Since 2000, Ich Troje has been one of the most successful Polish groups. They have sold more than 1.5 million records since June 2001. Their songs are typically about love, betrayal and break-ups.  They represented Poland in the Eurovision Song Contest twice: with "Keine Grenzen – Żadnych granic" in 2003 and "Follow My Heart" in 2006.

Members
Former members are Magdalena Pokora (a.k.a. Magda Femme, 1996–2000), Justyna Majkowska (2000–2003), Elli Mücke (2003) and Ania Wisniewska (2003–2010). After a series of auditions including fan votes, Norwegian singer Jeanette Vik was in December 2010 chosen as the band's next lead singer.

Eurovision 2003
On 25 January 2003, Polish TV viewers chose Ich Troje to represent them in 2003 Eurovision Song Contest by televoting. The band took part in the contest with the song "Keine Grenzen – Żadnych granic" (English translation: "No Borders"), a trilingual song performed in German, Polish and Russian. The song is a dramatic ballad, in which the singers express their desire to be astronauts, gazing down from space at the earth. As well as the beauty of the spectacle, they sing that from that distance it is impossible to see borders, flags and warfare. The theme of the need for peace is underscored by the multilingual lyrics, in which Polish is performed alongside the languages of two neighbouring states which have historically fought with Poland. The song received the maximum 12 points from Germany but none from Russia. The song finished 7th in a field of 26 entries.

A fully German version of the song was recorded as well. Another trilingual version (French, English, Esperanto) was recorded in 2016.

Eurovision 2006
The group setup was arranged to add a fifth member when taking part in the Eurovision Song Contest 2006, by adding the German rapper O-Jay (Olaf Jeglitza) of the German Eurodance act, Real McCoy. For Eurovision, credit was Ich Troje featuring Real McCoy and the song was "Follow My Heart". Their music was castigated by critics. The song finished 11th in the semi-final failing to qualify to the final.

Discography

Studio albums

Compilation albums

References

External links

  

Polish pop music groups
Eurovision Song Contest entrants for Poland
Eurovision Song Contest entrants of 2003
Eurovision Song Contest entrants of 2006